Aaltoska orkaniseeraa is a 1949 Finnish comedy film directed by Edvin Laine. The film was released on 15 July 1949.

Cast   
Elna Hellman ....  Mrs. Aaltonen 
Hannes Häyrinen ....  Lipponen, crime reporter 
Veli-Matti Kaitala ....  Jukka (as Veli-Matti) 
Eija Inkeri   
Pentti Irjala .... Constable (uncredited)
Mauri Jaakkola  
Sasu Haapanen
Armas Jokio ....  Room applicant 
Birger Kortman  
Irja Kuusla

Critical response 
Aaltoska orkaniseeraa received generally positive reviews.

References

External links
 

1949 films
1940s Finnish-language films
1949 comedy films
Films directed by Edvin Laine
Finnish comedy films
Finnish black-and-white films